Eastern Coalfields Limited (ECL) is a coal producer based in India. The company was founded in 1975 after nationalisation of coal mines in India. It operates coal mines in Jharkhand and West Bengal states of India. It inherited all the private sector coal mines of the Raniganj Coalfield. It is one of the fully owned subsidiaries of Coal India Limited. The company has its headquarters at Sanctoria, in West Bengal.

Backdrop
Coalmining in India first started in the Raniganj Coalfield. In 1774, John Sumner and Suetonius Grant Heatly of the British East India Company found coal near Ethora, presently in Salanpur community development block. The early exploration and mining operations were carried out in a haphazard manner.

Regular mining started in 1820, led by an agency house, Alexander & Co. In 1835, Prince Dwarkanath Tagore bought over the collieries and Carr, Tagore and Company led the field. For the entire 19th century and a major part of the 20th century, Ranigunj coalfields was the major producer of coal in the country.

At the behest of William Princep, Carr, Tagore and Company joined hands with Gilmore Homfray and Co. in 1843 to form Bengal Coal Co., which opened up coal mining activities. Their headquarters was at Sanctoria.

Nationalisation of the coal industry was in stages. The management of coking coal mines was taken over in 1971 and the coking coal mines were nationalised in 1972. The management of non-coking coal mines was taken over on 31 January 1973 and these were nationalised on 1 May 1973. Coal India Limited, a holding company, was formed in 1975, encompassing the entire coal industry.
In 2016–17, CIL produced 554.14 million tonnes of coal. It is the single-largest coal producer in the world. Eastern Coalfields Ltd. is one of the 7 wholly owned producing subsidiaries of CIL

At the time of nationalisation, 414 coal mines, almost wholly in the Raniganj Coalfield, came under the jurisdiction of ECL. The mines were regrouped to around 123 mines.  Production from these mines in 1973-74 was 21 million tonnes, of which 20.744 million tonnes were from underground mines and the rest from manual quarries. The percentage of production from the underground mines has declined from 98.49% at the time of nationalisation to 18.23% in 2014–15. The focus is on technological upgradation of underground mines.  In 2014–15, the technology-wise production from the underground mines (in million tonnes) was: conventional bord and pillar – 0.539, mechanised bord and pillar – 5.335, mechanised longwall (including road header) – 0.025, continuous miner – 1.397, Total – 7.296.

Geography
ECL mining leasehold area is 753.75 km2 and surface right area is 237.18 km2It is spread across West Bengal and Jharkhand. ECL operates in Raniganj Coalfield in West Bengal, Mugma field (in Dhanbad district), Rajmahal Coalmines Projects (in Godda district) and Saherjuri Coalfield (in Deoghar district) in Jharkhand. The heart of the Raniganj Coalfield is located south of the Ajay River and north of the Damodar River in Paschim Bardhaman district. Mejia (in Bankura district) and Parbelia (in Purulia district) are located south of the Damodar. Palasthali (in Birbhum district) is located north of the Ajay. The Mugma field is located west of the Barakar River and north of the Damodar.

The formation of coal seams in the Raniganj Coalfield-Mugma field of ECL has occurred mainly in Raniganj measures and Barakar measures. The Santhal Pargana mines and the Rajmahal Area are mainly related to Barakar measures and Talchair series.

Reserves
, ECL has proved reserves of 16.94 billion tonnes – 12.42 billion tonnes in West Bengal and 4.52 billion tonnes in Jharkhand. Total reserves in the ECL command area, up to a depth of 600 m, was 49.17 billion tonnes.

Performance
, Eastern Coalfields had 14 operating areas with 87 working mines, 60 being underground mines, 19 open cast and 8 mixed mines. In 2016–17, ECL produced 40.517 million tonnes of coal, of which 32.319 million tonnes were from open cast mines and 8.127 million tonnes were from underground mines. It was the highest ever production. Offtake of coal from ECL by the power sector was 40.121 million tonnes in 2016–17.

Operating areas
A broad area-wise distribution of coalmines of Eastern Coalfield Limited is given below:

Note: All the linked Area pages provide relevant details of the collieries and carry maps indicating the location of the collieries

Mining plan
An overview of the mining plan of ECL covering 12 clusters is given below. Further details are available on the linked Area pages.

References

Coal India subsidiaries
Coal companies of India
Mining in West Bengal
Companies based in Asansol
Energy companies established in 1975
Non-renewable resource companies established in 1975
Government-owned companies of India
Companies nationalised by the Government of India
1975 establishments in West Bengal